is a 2002 Japanese film directed by Shinji Aoyama, starring Masatoshi Nagase. The film is a feature-length cut of an episode of the television series The Private Detective Mike shown at film festivals and released theatrically.

Cast

Production
Mike Yokohama: A Forest with No Name was originally one episode in the 12-part television series The Private Detective Mike which aired on Yomiuri TV in 2002. Each episode was 45–55 minutes long and shot by a different director, including such well-known filmmakers as Alex Cox, Shinobu Yaguchi, and Isao Yukisada. All of them featured the character Mike Hama, a detective who was the center of a trilogy of films directed by Kaizo Hayashi. Aoyama's episode was shot in super 16 mm and blown up to 35 mm for release in theatres.

Release
The film was screened at the 52nd Berlin International Film Festival in 2002 and at the Cleveland International Film Festival in 2003. The film was received a theatrical release in France under the title La forêt sans nom.

Reception
Todd Brown of Twitch Film described the film as "a strikingly composed and completely open ended study of the nature of desire and identity." He said, "[Shinji] Aoyama's stylistic flourishes are in full effect and Masatoshi Nagase gives an excellent, multi layered performance as Hama himself." On the other hand, Time Out London's review was less favourable. The reviewers at FilmBizarro found the movie enjoyable, and noted that watching it "will lead to interesting conversations between viewers".

References

External links
 

2002 television films
2002 films
Films directed by Shinji Aoyama
2000s Japanese films
2000s Japanese-language films
Japanese mystery drama films